Allikukivi Landscape Conservation Area is a nature park situated in Pärnu County, Estonia.

The protected area was designated in 2017 to protect Allikukivi Ancient Valley and its surrounding areas.

References

Nature reserves in Estonia
Geography of Pärnu County